Enrique Fontana Codina (17 October 1921 – 25 June 1989) was a Spanish politician who served as Minister of Trade of Spain between 1969 and 1973, during the Francoist dictatorship.

References

1921 births
1989 deaths
Economy and finance ministers of Spain
Government ministers during the Francoist dictatorship